

Events

January
 January 2 – Chadian–Libyan conflict – Battle of Fada: The Chadian army destroys a Libyan armoured brigade.
 January 4 – 1987 Maryland train collision: An Amtrak train en route from Washington, D.C. to Boston collides with Conrail engines at Chase, Maryland, United States, killing 16 people.
 January 15 – Hu Yaobang, General Secretary of the Chinese Communist Party, is forced into retirement by political conservatives.
 January 16 – León Febres Cordero, president of Ecuador, is kidnapped for 11 hours by followers of imprisoned general Frank Vargas, who successfully demand the latter's release.
 January 20 – Terry Waite, the special envoy of the Archbishop of Canterbury in Lebanon, is kidnapped in Beirut (released November 1991).
 January 24 – 1987 Forsyth County protests: About 20,000 protestors marched in a civil rights demonstration in Forsyth County, Georgia, United States.

February 
 February 6 – The Soviet oil tanker Antonio Gramsci suffers a minor shipwreck in Finnish waters en route to the Neste oil refinery in Porvoo, resulting in an oil spill of approximately 570–650 tons.
 February 11
 British Airways is privatised and listed on the London Stock Exchange.
 The new Constitution of the Philippines goes into effect. This new constitution adds Spanish and Arabic as optional languages of the Philippines.
 February 20 – A second Unabomber bomb explodes at a Salt Lake City computer store in the United States, injuring the owner.
 February 23 – SN 1987A, the first "naked-eye" supernova since 1604, is observed.
 February 25 – Beginning of the Phosphorite War protest movement in the Estonian SSR.
 February 26 – Iran–Contra affair: The Tower Commission rebukes U.S. President Ronald Reagan for not controlling his National Security Council staff.

March 
 March 1 – The first Starbucks outside of the US is opened in Vancouver, Canada.
 March 2 – New Zealand's most destructive earthquake in 19 years hits near the city of Edgecumbe, killing 1 person and leaving 25 injured.
 March 4 – U.S. President Ronald Reagan addresses the American people on the Iran–Contra affair, acknowledging that his overtures to Iran had "deteriorated" into an arms-for-hostages deal.

 March 6 – Zeebrugge disaster: Roll-on/roll-off cross-channel ferry  capsizes off Zeebrugge harbor in Belgium; 193 people die.
 March 7 – 1987 Lieyu massacre: The Republic of China Army execute 19 unarmed Vietnamese refugees on Donggang beach, Lieyu, Kinmen off Mainland China.
 March 18 – Woodstock of physics: A marathon session of the American Physical Society's meeting features 51 presentations concerning the science of high-temperature superconductors.
 March 20 – AZT is approved by the United States Food and Drug Administration for use in the treatment of HIV/AIDS.
 March 24 – Michael Eisner, CEO of The Walt Disney Company, and French Prime Minister and future President of France, Jacques Chirac, sign an agreement to construct the  Euro Disney Resort (now called Disneyland Paris) and to develop the Val d'Europe area of the new town Marne-la-Vallée in Paris, France.
 March 29
 The World Wrestling Federation (later WWE) produces WrestleMania III from the Pontiac Silverdome in Pontiac, Michigan. The event is particularly notable for the record attendance of 93,173, the largest recorded attendance for a live indoor sporting event in North America until February 14, 2010, when the 2010 NBA All-Star Game has an attendance of 108,713 at AT&T Stadium. 
 A hybrid solar eclipse was the second hybrid solar eclipse in less than one year, the first being on October 3, 1986. It was annular visible in southern Argentina, Gabon, Equatorial Guinea, Cameroon, Central African Republic, Sudan (part of the path of annularity crossed today's South Sudan), Ethiopia, Djibouti and northern Somalia and total visible in Atlantic Ocean, lasting just 7.57 seconds.
 March 30 – The 59th Academy Awards take place in Los Angeles, with Platoon winning Best Picture.
 March 31 – Margaret Thatcher, Prime Minister of the United Kingdom, conducts a 45-minute interview on Soviet television.

April 
 April 13 – The governments of the Portuguese Republic and the People's Republic of China sign an agreement in which Macau will be returned to China in 1999.
 April 19 – The Simpsons cartoon first appears as a series of shorts on The Tracey Ullman Show.
 April 21 – In Colombo, Sri Lanka, the Central Bus Station Bombing kills 113 civilians.
 April 27 – The United States Department of Justice declares incumbent Austrian president Kurt Waldheim an "undesirable alien".
 April 30 – Canadian Prime Minister Brian Mulroney and the Provincial Premiers agree on principle to the Meech Lake Accord which would bring Quebec into the constitution.

May 
 May 8 – Loughgall ambush: A 24-man unit of the British Army Special Air Service (SAS) ambushed eight members of the Provisional Irish Republican Army (IRA) as they mounted an attack on a Royal Ulster Constabulary (RUC) barracks. All IRA members were killed as well as one civilian.
 May 9 – A Soviet-made Ilyushin Il-62 airliner, operated by LOT Polish Airlines, crashes into a forest just outside Warsaw, killing all 183 people on board.
 May 11 – Klaus Barbie goes on trial in Lyon for war crimes committed during World War II.
 May 14 – Lieutenant Colonel Sitiveni Rabuka executes a bloodless coup in Fiji.
 May 17 –  is hit by two Iraqi-owned Exocet AM39 air-to-surface missiles killing 37 sailors.
 May 22
 The Hashimpura massacre occurs in Meerut, India.
 The first ever Rugby World Cup kicks off with New Zealand playing Italy at Eden Park, Auckland.
 May 27 
 At the Prater Stadium of Vienna, Porto of Portugal defeats Bayern München of West Germany 2–1 and wins its first European Cup.
 In one of the densest concentrations of humanity in history, a crowd of 800,000+ packed shoulder-to-shoulder onto the Golden Gate Bridge and its approaches for its 50th Anniversary celebration.
 May 28 – Eighteen-year-old West German pilot Mathias Rust evades Soviet air defenses and lands a private plane on Red Square in Moscow. He is immediately detained (released on August 3, 1988).

June 
 June 3 – The Vanuatu Labour Party is founded.
 June 8 – The New Zealand Nuclear Free Zone, Disarmament, and Arms Control Act is passed, the first of its kind in the world.
 June 11 – The Conservative Party of the United Kingdom, led by Margaret Thatcher, is re-elected for a third term at the 1987 general election.
 June 12 – During a visit to Berlin, Germany, U.S. President Ronald Reagan challenges Soviet general secretary Mikhail Gorbachev to tear down the Berlin Wall.
 June 17 – With the death of the last known individual, the dusky seaside sparrow, a subspecies native to the US state of Florida, becomes extinct.
 June 19
 Teddy Seymour is officially designated the first black man to sail around the world, when he completes his solo sailing circumnavigation in Frederiksted, St. Croix, of the United States Virgin Islands.
 Edwards v. Aguillard: The Supreme Court of the United States rules that a Louisiana law requiring that creation science be taught in public schools whenever evolution is taught is unconstitutional.
 Hipercor bombing: the Basque terrorist group ETA perpetrate a car-bomb attack at an Hipercor market in Barcelona, killing 21 and hurting 45.
 June 27 – A commercial HS 748 (Philippine Airlines Flight 206) crashes near Baguio, Philippines, killing 50.
 June 28
 Iraqi warplanes drop mustard-gas bombs on the Iranian town of Sardasht in two separate bombing rounds, on four residential areas. This is the first time a civilian town was targeted by chemical weapons.
 An accidental explosion at the Hohenfels Training Area in West Germany kills 3 U.S. troops.
 June 29 – South Korean politician, presidential candidate of the ruling party Roh Tae-woo makes a speech promising a wide program of nationwide reforms, the result of the June Democracy Movement.
 June 30 – Canada introduces a one-dollar coin, nicknamed the "Loonie".

July 
 July 1 – The Single European Act is passed by the European Community.
 July 3 – Greater Manchester Police recover the body of 16-year-old Pauline Reade from Saddleworth Moor, after her killers Ian Brady and Myra Hindley help them in their search, almost exactly 24 years since Pauline was last seen alive.
 July 4 – A court in Lyon sentences former Gestapo boss Klaus Barbie to life imprisonment for crimes against humanity.
 July 11
 1987 Australian federal election: Bob Hawke's Labor Government is re-elected with an increased majority, defeating the Liberal Party led by John Howard and the National Party led by Ian Sinclair.
 World population is estimated to have reached five billion people, according to the United Nations.
 July 15 – Martial law in Taiwan ends after 38 years.
 July 17 – The Dow Jones Industrial Average closes above the 2,500 mark for the first time, at 2,510.04.
 July 22 – Palestinian cartoonist Naji Salim al-Ali is shot in London; he dies August 28.
 July 25 – The East Lancashire Railway, a heritage railway in the North West of England, is opened between Bury and Ramsbottom.
 July 27 – The song Never Gonna Give You Up a single was created and released by Rick Astley.
 July 31
 Four hundred pilgrims are killed in clashes between demonstrating Iranian pilgrims and Saudi Arabian security forces in Mecca.
 Docklands Light Railway in London, the first driverless railway in Great Britain, is formally opened by Queen Elizabeth II.
 An F4-rated tornado devastates eastern Edmonton, Alberta; hardest hit are an industrial park and a trailer park. 27 people are killed and hundreds injured, with hundreds more left homeless and jobless.

August 
 August 4
 The World Commission on Environment and Development, also known as the Brundtland Commission, publishes its report, Our Common Future.
 The Federal Communications Commission rescinds the Fairness Doctrine, which had required radio and television stations to present alternative views on controversial issues.
 August 7
 The Colombian frigate Caldas enters Venezuelan waters near the Los Monjes Archipelago, sparking the Caldas frigate crisis between both nations.
 American Lynne Cox becomes the first person to swim the Bering Strait, crossing from Little Diomede Island to Big Diomede in 2 hours and 5 minutes.
 August 9 – Hoddle Street massacre in Australia: Julian Knight, 19, goes on a shooting rampage in the Melbourne suburb of Clifton Hill, Victoria, killing 7 people and injuring 19 before surrendering to police.
 August 14 – All the children held at Kai Lama, a rural property on Lake Eildon, Australia, run by the Santiniketan Park Association, are released after a police raid.
 August 16
 Northwest Airlines Flight 255 (a McDonnell Douglas MD-82) crashes on takeoff from Detroit Metropolitan Airport in Romulus, Michigan just west of Detroit killing all but one (4-year old Cecelia Cichan) of the 156 people on board.
 The followers of the Harmonic Convergence claim it was observed around the world.
 August 17 – Rudolf Hess is found dead in his cell in Spandau Prison. Hess, 93, is believed to have committed suicide by hanging himself with an electrical flex. He was the last remaining prisoner at the complex, which is soon demolished.
 August 19
 Hungerford massacre: Sixteen people die in an apparently motiveless mass shooting in the United Kingdom, carried out by Michael Ryan.
 ABC News' chief Middle East correspondent Charles Glass escapes his Hezbollah kidnappers in Beirut, Lebanon, after 62 days in captivity.
 The Order of the Garter is opened to women. 
 August 23 – The Hirvepark meeting is organized as the first unsanctioned political meeting in Estonian Soviet Socialist Republic, in commemoration of the Molotov–Ribbentrop Pact.

September 

 September 2 – In Moscow, USSR, the trial begins for 19-year-old pilot Mathias Rust, who flew his Cessna airplane into Red Square in May.
 September 3 – In a coup d'état in Burundi, President Jean-Baptiste Bagaza is deposed by Major Pierre Buyoya.
 September 7–21 – The world's first conference on artificial life is held at Los Alamos National Laboratory in the United States.
 September 13 – Goiânia accident: Metal scrappers open an old radiation source abandoned in a hospital in Goiânia, Brazil, causing the worst radiation accident ever in an urban area.
 September 15 – Pope John Paul II arrives in Los Angeles for a two-day papal visit, his first one ever to the city, where he makes an arrival day speech to local leaders of the U.S. entertainment industry.
 September 17 – Pope John Paul II arrives in San Francisco for his first visit to the city, in which he embraces several AIDS sufferers, including an infected child, and proclaims abstinence from illicit sex and drugs are the two main ways to avoid infection.

October 
 October 3 – The Canada–United States Free Trade Agreement is reached but still requires ratification. This agreement would be a precursor to NAFTA.
 October 6 – Fiji becomes a republic.
 October 7 – Sikh nationalists declare the independence of Khalistan from India.
 October 15 – In Burkina Faso, a military coup is orchestrated by Blaise Compaoré against incumbent President Thomas Sankara.

 October 15–16 – Great Storm of 1987: Hurricane-force winds hit much of southern England, killing 23 people.
 October 19
 Black Monday: Stock market levels fall sharply on Wall Street and around the world.
 US warships destroy two Iranian oil platforms in the Persian Gulf.
 Two commuter trains collide head-on on the outskirts of Jakarta, Indonesia; 102 are killed.
 October 22 
 The pilot of a British Aerospace BAE Harrier GR5 registered ZD325 accidentally ejects from his aircraft. The jet continues to fly until it runs out of fuel and crashes into the Irish Sea.
 October 23
 British champion jockey Lester Piggott is jailed for three years after being convicted of tax evasion.
 On a vote of 58–42, the United States Senate rejects President Ronald Reagan's nomination of Robert Bork to the Supreme Court.
 October 26 – The Dow Jones Industrial Average goes down 156.83 points.

November 

 November 1 – The InterCity 125 breaks the world speed record for a diesel-powered train, reaching 238 km/h (147.88 mph).
 November 7
 Zine El Abidine Ben Ali assumes the Presidency of Tunisia.
 Lynne Cox swims between the Diomede Islands from the American Little Diomede Island to the Soviet Big Diomede Island.
 Mass Rapid Transit (MRT) system in Singapore opens for passenger service. 
 November 8 – Enniskillen bombing: Twelve people are killed by a Provisional Irish Republican Army bomb at a Remembrance Day service at Enniskillen.
 November 12 – The first Kentucky Fried Chicken restaurant in Mainland China opens in Beijing, near Tiananmen Square.
 November 15 – In Brașov, Romania, workers rebel against the communist regime led by Nicolae Ceaușescu.
 November 16 – The Parlatino Treaty of Institutionalization is signed.
 November 17 – A tsunami hits the Gulf of Alaska.
 November 18
 The King's Cross fire on the London Underground kills 31 people and injures a further 100.
 Iran–Contra affair: U.S. Senate and House panels release reports charging President Ronald Reagan with 'ultimate responsibility' for the affair.
 November 22 – Max Headroom broadcast signal intrusion – unknown perpetrators hijack the signal of WGN-TV for about 20 seconds, and WTTW for about 90 seconds, and displays a strange video of a man in a Max Headroom mask.
 November 25 – Category 5 Typhoon Nina smashes the Philippines with  winds and a devastating storm surge, causing destruction and 812 deaths.
 November 28 – South African Airways Flight 295 crashes into the Indian Ocean off Mauritius, due to a fire in the cargo hold; the 159 passengers and crew perish.
 November 29 – Korean Air Flight 858 is blown up over the Andaman Sea, killing 115 crew and passengers. North Korean agents are responsible for the bombing.

December 
 December – Fluoxetine, marketed as Prozac, is approved for use as an antidepressant in the United States by the Food and Drug Administration.
 December 1
 NASA announces the names of 4 companies awarded contracts to help build Space Station Freedom: Boeing Aerospace, General Electric's Astro-Space Division, McDonnell Douglas, and the Rocketdyne Division of Rockwell.
 Queensland: Following a week of turmoil from his National Party of Australia colleagues, Joh Bjelke-Petersen resigns as Premier of Queensland. He is replaced by Mike Ahern, the only premier never to contest an election as premier.
 December 7 – Pacific Southwest Airlines Flight 1771 crashes near Paso Robles, California, United States, killing all 43 on board, after a disgruntled passenger shoots his ex-supervisor on the flight, then shoots both pilots.
 December 8
 Israeli–Palestinian conflict: The First Intifada begins in the Gaza Strip and West Bank.
 Queen Street massacre: In Melbourne, Australia, 22-year-old Frank Vitkovic kills 8 people and injures another 5 in a Post Office building before committing suicide by jumping from the eleventh floor.
 The Intermediate-Range Nuclear Forces Treaty is signed in Washington, D.C. by U.S. President Ronald Reagan and Soviet leader Mikhail Gorbachev. It later expires in 2019.
 Alianza Lima air disaster: A Peruvian Navy Fokker F27 crashes near Ventanilla, Peru, killing 43.
 December 9 – General Rahimuddin Khan retires from the Pakistan Army, along with the cabinet of the country's military dictatorship.
 December 15 – Production I.G is founded by Mitsuhisa Ishikawa and Takayuki Goto.
 December 17 – Gustáv Husák resigns as General Secretary of the Communist Party of Czechoslovakia.
 December 20 – In history's worst peacetime sea disaster, the passenger ferry MV Doña Paz sinks after colliding with the oil tanker Vector 1 in the Tablas Strait in the Philippines, killing an estimated 4,000 people (1,749 official).
 December 21 – Turgut Özal of ANAP forms the new government of Turkey (46th government).
 December 22 – In Zimbabwe, the political parties ZANU and ZAPU reach an agreement that ends the violence in the Matabeleland region known as the Gukurahundi.
 December 23 - Nikki Sixx, Mötley Crüe's bassist overdoses on heroin and is reportedly declared clinically dead for two minutes before a paramedic revived him with two syringes full of adrenaline.
 December 30 – Pope John Paul II issues the encyclical Sollicitudo rei socialis (On Social Concern).

Births

January 

 January 1 – Meryl Davis, American figure skater
 January 2 – Shelley Hennig, American actress and model
 January 5 
 Kristin Cavallari, American actress, fashion designer, and author
 Jason Mitchell, American actor 
January 6 – Zhang Lin, Chinese swimmer
 January 7
 Davide Astori, Italian footballer (d. 2018)
 Lyndsy Fonseca, American actress
 Sirusho, Armenian singer
 January 8 – Freddie Stroma, English actor and model
 January 9
 Lucas Leiva, Brazilian football player
 Paolo Nutini, Scottish singer
 Pablo Santos, Mexican actor (d. 2006)
 January 10 – César Cielo, Brazilian swimmer
 January 11
 Danuta Kozák, Hungarian sprint canoeist
 Jamie Vardy, English footballer
 January 12 – Naya Rivera, American actress and singer (d. 2020)
 January 13 – Jack Johnson, American ice hockey player
 January 14 – Dennis Aogo, German footballer
 January 15
 Greg Inglis, Australian rugby league player
 Tsegaye Kebede, Ethiopian long-distance runner
 Kelly Kelly, American professional wrestler
 Michael Seater, Canadian actor, director, screenwriter, and producer
 January 17 – Oleksandr Usyk, Ukrainian boxer
 January 18 
 Johan Djourou, Ivorian born-Swiss footballer
 Zane Holtz, Canadian actor and model
 January 19 – Arkadiy Vasilyev, Russian decathlete
 January 20
 Robert Farah, Colombian tennis player
 Evan Peters, American actor
 Marco Simoncelli, Italian motorcycle road racer (d. 2011)
 Serguey Torres, Cuban canoeist
 January 21 – Pablo Caballero González, Uruguayan footballer
 January 23 – Andrea, Bulgarian singer
 January 24
 Ruth Bradley, Irish television and film actress
 Wayne Hennessey, Welsh football player
 Luis Suárez, Uruguayan football player
 January 25 
 Maria Kirilenko, Russian tennis player
 Giselle Salandy, Trinidadian professional boxer (d.2009)
 January 26 
 Sebastian Giovinco, Italian football player
 Gojko Kačar, Serbian footballer
 January 27 – Hannah Teter, American snowboarder
 January 29 – José Abreu, Cuban baseball player
 January 30
 Becky Lynch, Irish professional wrestler
 Arda Turan, Turkish footballer
 January 31 – Marcus Mumford, English-American singer, songwriter, and musician (Mumford & Sons)

February 

 February 1
 Heather Morris, American actress and dancer
 Giuseppe Rossi, Italian footballer
 Ronda Rousey, American martial arts expert, actress and professional wrestler
 February 2 
 Faydee, Australian singer
 Gerard Piqué, Spanish footballer
 February 4 – Lucie Šafářová, Czech tennis player
 February 5
 Darren Criss, American singer and actor 
 Henry Golding, Malaysian-English actor, model, and television host
 Özge Gürel, Turkish actress
 February 7 
 Joel Freeland, British basketball player
 Kerli, Estonian singer
 February 8 – Carolina Kostner, Italian figure skater
 February 9
 Michael B. Jordan, American actor and producer
 Rose Leslie, Scottish actress
 Magdalena Neuner, German biathlete
 February 10
 Choi Siwon, South Korean recording artist
 Poli Genova, Bulgarian singer, songwriter, actress, and television presenter
 Yuja Wang, Chinese pianist 
 February 11
 Ebba Busch, Swedish politician
 José Callejón, Spanish footballer
 Ellen van Dijk, Dutch road and track cycling world champion
 February 13 – Eljero Elia, Dutch footballer
 February 12 – Gary LeRoi Gray, American actor
 February 14
 Edinson Cavani, Uruguayan footballer
 José Miguel Cubero, Costa Rican footballer
 February 16
 Luc Bourdon, Canadian ice hockey defenceman (d. 2008)
 Mauricio Henao, Colombian actor
Jon Ossoff, American politician, senior senator from Georgia
 February 17 
 Raffi Ahmad, Indonesian actor and comedian
 Ísis Valverde, Brazilian actress
 February 18 – Carla Hernández, Mexican actress
 February 20 
 Miles Teller, American actor
 Taylor Boggs, American Football Player 
 February 21
 Ashley Greene, American actress
 Tuppence Middleton, English actress
 February 22
 Han Hyo-joo, South Korean actress
 Sergio Romero, Argentine footballer
 February 24 – Tina Desai, Indian actress and model
 February 25 – Andrew Poje, Canadian figure skater
 February 26 – Johan Sjöstrand, Swedish handball player
 February 27 – Valeriy Andriytsev, Ukrainian wrestler

March 

 March 1 – Kesha, American singer
 March 2 – Solomon Okoronkwo, Nigerian footballer
 March 3 – Elnur Hüseynov, Azerbaijani singer
 March 5 – Anna Chakvetadze, Russian professional tennis player
 March 6 – Kevin-Prince Boateng, Ghanaian-German footballer
 March 9 – Bow Wow, American rapper and actor
 March 10
 Liu Shishi, Chinese actress
 Tuukka Rask, Finnish Ice Hockey player
 Emeli Sandé, Scottish recording artist and songwriter
 March 11
 Estefanía Villarreal, Mexican actress
 Ngonidzashe Makusha, Zimbabwean sprinter and long jumper
 March 12 
 Maxwell Holt, American volleyball player
 Teimour Radjabov, Azerbaijani chess player
 March 13 
 Marco Andretti, American IRL driver
 Mauro Zárate, Argentine footballer
 March 14 – Aravane Rezaï, Iranian-French tennis player
 March 16 – Alexandr Smyshlyaev, Russian freestyle skier
 March 17
 Federico Fazio, Argentine footballer
 Rob Kardashian, American television personality, model, and talent manager
 Bryan Dechart, American actor and Twitch streamer
 March 18
 Rebecca Soni, American swimmer
 Gabriel Mercado, Argentine footballer
 March 19 – AJ Lee, American professional wrestler
 March 20 – João Alves de Assis Silva (Jô), Brazilian soccer player
 March 21 – Yuri Ryazanov, Russian artistic gymnast (d. 2009)
 March 22 – Alexander Shatilov, Israeli artistic gymnast
 March 23 – Alan Toovey, Australian rules footballer
 March 24 
 Juan Diego Covarrubias, Mexican actor
 Ramires, Brazilian footballer
 March 25
 Victor Obinna, Nigerian footballer
 Nobunari Oda, Japanese figure skater
 March 26
 Larisa Korobeynikova, Russian fencer
 YUI, Japanese singer-songwriter
 March 27
 Polina Gagarina, Russian singer, songwriter, actress, and model
 Buster Posey, American Baseball Player
 Benjamin Savšek, Slovenian canoeist
 March 29 – Dénes Varga, Hungarian water polo player
 March 31 – Humpy Koneru, Indian chess grandmaster

April 

 April 1
 Mackenzie Davis, Canadian actress
 Ding Junhui, Chinese snooker player
 April 3 – Eddie Ockenden, Australian field hockey player
 April 4
 Océane Zhu, Chinese actress
 Sami Khedira, German footballer
 Sarah Gadon, Canadian actress
 April 7 – Martín Cáceres, Uruguayan footballer
 April 8 – Royston Drenthe, Dutch footballer
 April 9
 Pengiran Anak Sarah, wife of the Crown Prince of Brunei, Al-Muhtadee Billah
 Paddy Barnes, Irish boxer
 Blaise Matuidi, French footballer
 Jesse McCartney, American singer, songwriter and actor
 Sara Petersen, Danish hurdler
 April 10
 Hayley Westenra, New Zealand soprano
 Shay Mitchell, Canadian actress and model
 April 11
 Joss Stone, English singer and actress
 Lights Poxleitner, Canadian musician
 April 12
 Luiz Adriano, Brazilian footballer
 Brooklyn Decker, American fashion model and actress
 Brendon Urie, American musician
 April 15 
 Yasmani Copello, Cuban born-Turkish hurdler
 Samira Wiley, American actress and model
 April 16 
 Phoebe Fox, English actress
 Aaron Lennon, English footballer
 April 17 
 Medhi Benatia, French born-Moroccan footballer
 Jacqueline MacInnes Wood, Canadian actress
 April 18 
 Matt Anderson, American volleyball player
 Rosie Huntington-Whiteley, English supermodel
 April 19
 Joe Hart, English footballer
 Maria Sharapova, Russian tennis player
 Oksana Akinshina, Russian actress
 April 21 − Anastasia Prikhodko, Ukrainian folk rock and traditional pop singer
 April 22
 David Luiz, Brazilian footballer
 Mikel John Obi, Nigerian footballer
 April 24 
 Varun Dhawan, Indian actor
 Serdar Tasci, German footballer
 Jan Vertonghen, Belgian footballer
 April 25 − Arjit Singh, Indian playback singer
 April 26 − Jarmila Wolfe, Slovak born-Australian tennis player
 April 27
 Anne Suzuki, Japanese actress
 Emma Taylor-Isherwood, Canadian actress
 William Moseley, English actor
 April 28 
 Samantha Ruth Prabhu, Indian film actress and model
 Daequan Cook, American basketball player
 Zoran Tošić, Serbian footballer
 April 29 – Sara Errani, Italian tennis player
 April 30 – Rohit Sharma, Indian cricketer

May 

 May 1 
 Leonardo Bonucci, Italian footballer
 Matt Di Angelo, British Actor
 Shahar Pe'er, Israeli tennis player
 May 2 – Nana Kitade, Japanese singer
 May 3 – Damla Sönmez, Turkish actress
 May 4
 Cesc Fàbregas, Spanish football player
 Jorge Lorenzo, Spanish triple MotoGP world champion
 Zbigniew Bartman, Polish volleyball player
 Li Yifeng, Chinese male actor 
 May 6 
 Dries Mertens, Belgian footballer
 Moon Geun-young, Korean actress
 May 7 – Asami Konno, Japanese singer
 May 11
 Albulena Haxhiu, Kosovo Albanian politician
 Enikő Mihalik, Hungarian model
 Kamaru Usman, Nigerian born-American mixed martial artist
 May 12 
 Lee Wai-sze, Hong Kong cyclist
 Liu Hong, Chinese racewalker
 May 13
 Antonio Adán, Spanish footballer
 Hunter Parrish, American actor and singer
 Candice King, American actress and singer
 Marianne Vos, Dutch multiple cyclist
 May 15 
 Thaísa Menezes, Brazilian volleyball player
 Andy Murray, Scottish tennis player
 May 17 – Ott Lepland, Estonian singer
 May 18 – Luisana Lopilato, Argentine actress and singer
 May 20 – Julian Wright, American basketball player
 May 22
 Arturo Vidal, Chilean footballer
 Novak Djokovic, Serbian tennis player
 May 23 – Bray Wyatt, American professional wrestler
 May 24 – Fabio Fognini, Italian tennis player
 May 25 – Kamil Stoch, Polish ski jumper
 May 26
 Tooji, Norwegian-Iranian singer, model and television host
 Brandi Cyrus, American actress, singer and DJ
 May 27 
 Gervinho, Ivorian footballer
 Bella Heathcote, Australian actress
 Martina Sáblíková, Czech speed skater
 May 29 
 Noah Reid, Canadian actor and musician
 Daniela Ryf, Swiss triathlete
 May 31 – Shaun Fleming, American musician and actor

June 

 June 1 – Yarisley Silva, Cuban pole vaulter
 June 2
 Tobias Arlt, German Olympic luger
 Sonakshi Sinha, Indian actress
 June 3
 Lalaine, American actress, singer-songwriter, and bassist
 Masami Nagasawa, Japanese actress
 June 6 – Cássio, Brazilian footballer
 June 10 – He Chong, Chinese diver
 June 11 
 Robertlandy Simón, Cuban volleyball player
 Didrik Solli-Tangen, Norwegian singer
 June 12
 Abbey Lee, Australian model
 Antonio Barragán, Spanish footballer
 June 16 – Tobias Wendl, German Olympic luger
 June 17
 Nozomi Tsuji, Japanese singer
 Kendrick Lamar, American rapper
 June 18
 Ezgi Asaroğlu, Turkish actress
 Niels Schneider, French-Canadian actor
 Zsuzsanna Tomori, Hungarian handball player
 June 20
 A-fu, Taiwanese singer and songwriter
 Asmir Begović, Bosnian footballer
 Daiana Menezes, Brazilian actress, model, and television host 
 June 21 
 Khatia Buniatishvili, Georgian concert pianist
 Kim Ryeo-wook, South Korean singer
 Sebastian Prödl, Austrian footballer
 June 22
 Joe Dempsie, English actor
 Eda Erdem, Turkish volleyball player
 Nikita Rukavytsya, Ukrainian born-Australian soccer player
 Lee Min-ho, South Korean actor, singer and model
 June 23
 Guillaume Bonnafond, French road bicycle racer
 Nando de Colo, French basketball player
 Aaron Groom, Fijian rugby league footballer
 June 24
 Lionel Messi, Argentine footballer
 Pierre Vaultier, French snowboarder
 June 25 – Sandrine Gruda, French basketball player
 June 26
 Samir Nasri, French footballer
 Wallace de Souza, Brazilian volleyball player
 June 28 – Ayaka Kikuchi, Japanese speed skater

July 

 July 1 – Ahn Jae-hyun, South Korean model and actor
 July 2 
 Esteban Granero, Spanish footballer
 Ruslana Korshunova, Kazakhstani model (d. 2008)
 July 3
 Maximilian Mauff, German actor
 Sebastian Vettel, German racing driver, 4-time champions in Formula One
 July 4
 Ater Majok, Sudanese basketball player
 Prajwal Devaraj, Indian film actor
 July 5
 David Halaifonua, Tongan rugby union player
 Ji Chang-wook, South Korean actor
 Chen Xiao, Chinese actor and model
 July 6
 Kate Nash, British singer-songwriter
 Caroline Trentini, Brazilian model
 July 9
 Rebecca Sugar, American animator and creator of Steven Universe
 Élodie Fontan, French actress
 July 11 – Maximilian Müller, German field hockey player
 July 13 – Eva Rivas, Armenian-Russian singer
 July 14
 Sara Canning, Canadian actress
 Dan Reynolds, American singer and musician
 July 16 – AnnaLynne McCord, American actress
 July 18 – Tontowi Ahmad, Indonesian badminton player
 July 19
 Yan Gomes, Brazilian baseball player
 Ho Ho Lun, Hong Kong wrestler
 July 20 – Owen Cheung, Hong Kong actor
 July 22 – Andrey Golubev, Russian born-Kazikhstani tennis player
 July 23 – Julian Nagelsmann, German football coach
 July 24 – Mara Wilson, American actress and writer
 July 25 – Eran Zahavi, Israeli footballer 
 July 27 – Marek Hamšík, Slovak footballer
 July 28
 Sumire, Japanese fashion model (d. 2009)
 Pedro, Spanish footballer
 July 31
 Brittany Byrnes, Australian actress
 Michael Bradley, American soccer player

August 

 August 1 
 Iago Aspas, Spanish footballer
 Marta Walczykiewicz, Polish sprint canoeist
 August 4 – Phil Younghusband, British-Filipino footballer
 August 6 – Tosaint Ricketts, Canadian soccer player
 August 7 – Sidney Crosby, Canadian ice hockey player
 August 8 – Katie Leung, Scottish actress
 August 11 – Greysia Polii, Indonesian badminton player
 August 14 
 Johnny Gargano, American wrestler
 Sinem Kobal, Turkish actress
 August 16
 Eri Kitamura, Japanese voice actress and singer
 Okieriete Onaodowan, Nigerian actor
 Carey Price, Canadian ice hockey goaltender
 August 18 – Joanna Jędrzejczyk, Polish mixed martial artist and kickboxer
 August 19 – Nico Hülkenberg, German racing driver
 August 20
 Cătălina Ponor, Romanian gymnast
 Tulus, Indonesian singer
 August 21 – Anton Shipulin, Russian biathlete
 August 22 – Mohammad Mousavi, Iranian fencer
 August 24 – Anže Kopitar, Slovene ice hockey player
 August 25
 Liu Yifei, Chinese actress
 Blake Lively, American actress
 Amy Macdonald, Scottish singer and songwriter
 Rona Nishliu, Albanian singer, radio presenter, and humanitarian
 Ksenia Sukhinova, Russian model, television host and beauty queen who was crowned Miss World 2008.
 August 29 – Marko Podraščanin, Serbian volleyball player
 August 30 – Roy Krishna, Fijian footballer

September 

 September 1 – Leonel Suárez, Cuban decathlete
 September 2
 Scott Moir, Canadian figure skater
 Spencer Smith, American musician
 September 3 
 Flora Duffy, Bermudian triathlete
 James Neal, Canadian ice hockey player
 September 4 – Maryna Linchuk, Belarusian model
 September 6 – Anna Pavlova, Russian artistic gymnast
 September 7
 Mohammad Ahsan, Indonesian badminton player
 Denis Istomin, Russian born-Uzbek tennis player
 Evan Rachel Wood, American actress and singer
 Aleksandra Wozniak, Canadian tennis player
 September 8
 Wiz Khalifa, American rapper
 Alexandre Bilodeau, Canadian freestyle skier
 September 9
 Afrojack, Dutch DJ and music producer
 Ahmed Elmohamady, Egyptian footballer
 Andrea Petkovic, Bosnian born-German tennis player
 Alex Song, Cameroonian footballer
 Milan Stanković, Serbian pop-folk singer
 September 10 – Paul Goldschmidt, American baseball player
 September 11
 Elizabeth Henstridge, English actress
 Tyler Hoechlin, American actor
 Susianna Kentikian, German-Armenian boxer
 Ilija Spasojević, Indonesian footballer
 September 12 – Yaroslava Shvedova, Kazakhstani tennis player
 September 13 – G.NA, Canadian singer
 September 15 – Aly Cissokho, French footballer
 September 19 – Danielle Panabaker, American actress
 September 21 – Ryan Guzman, American actor
 September 22 
 Tom Felton, English actor and musician
 Zdravko Kuzmanović, Serbian footballer
 September 25 
 Ione Belarra, Spanish politician
 Monica Niculescu, Romanian tennis player
 September 26 – Jang Keun Suk, South Korean actor, singer and model
 September 27 – Luke Campbell, British boxer
 September 28 – Hilary Duff, American actress, businesswoman, singer, songwriter, producer, and writer
 September 29 – Anaïs Demoustier, French actress
 September 30
 Ramy Ashour, Egyptian squash player
 Aida Garifullina, Russian operatic soprano
 Elanne Kong, Hong Kong actress and singer

October 

 October 1 
 Matthew Daddario, American actor
 Ketleyn Quadros, Brazilian judoka
 October 2 – Joe Ingles, Australian basketball player
 October 3 – Zuleyka Rivera, Puerto Rican beauty queen (Miss Puerto Rico Universe 2006, Miss Universe 2006)
 October 4 – Marina Weisband, German politician
 October 5 – Foluke Gunderson, American volleyball player
 October 8 – Aya Hirano, Japanese voice actress and singer
 October 10 – Carla Esparza, American mixed martial artist
 October 11 – Ariella Käslin, Swiss artistic gymnast
 October 15
 Jesse Levine, American-Canadian tennis player
 Mizuho Sakaguchi, Japanese woman footballer
 October 16
 Seungho, South Korean pop singer (MBLAQ)
 Michael Venus, New Zealand tennis player
 Zhao Liying, Chinese actress
 October 18
 Zac Efron, American actor and singer
 Freja Beha Erichsen, Danish model
 October 23 
 Carmella, American professional wrestler
 Miyuu Sawai, Japanese actress
 October 24 – Charlie White, American figure skater
 October 25 – Fabian Hambüchen, German gymnast
 October 26 – Tommy Johansson, Swedish musician (Sabaton)
 October 27
 Thelma Aoyama, Japanese singer
 Yi Jianlian, Chinese basketball player (year of birth disputed)
 October 28
 Frank Ocean, American singer and rapper 
 Na Yeon Choi, South Korean female professional golfer
 October 29 
 Tove Lo, Swedish singer
 Makoto Ogawa, Japanese singer

November 

 November 1 – Ileana D'Cruz, Indian actress
 November 3
 Colin Kaepernick, American football player
 Gemma Ward, Australian model
 November 4 – T.O.P, Korean rapper
 November 5 
 Erin Brady, American television host, model and beauty pageant
 Kevin Jonas, American actor and singer-songwriter
 November 6
 Ana Ivanovic, Serbian tennis player
 G.O, South Korean singer (MBLAQ)
 November 9 
 Nouchka Fontijn, Dutch boxer
 Jennifer Holland, American actress and model
 November 10 – Jessica Tovey, Australian actress
 November 11
 Yuya Tegoshi, Japanese singer (NEWS, Tegomass)
 Giles Matthey, Australian actor
 November 12
 Jason Day, Australian golfer
 Kengo Kora, Japanese actor
 Juan José Ballesta, Spanish actor
 November 13 – Dana Vollmer, Australian swimmer
 November 14 
 Sofia Assefa, Ethiopian middle distance runner
 Brian Gleeson, Irish actor
 Nour El-Refai, Lebanese born-Swedish actress and comedian
 November 15 – Sergio Llull, Spanish basketball player
 November 22 – Mauro Nespoli, Italian archer
 November 23
 Nicklas Bäckström, Swedish Ice Hockey player
 Kasia Struss, Polish model
 November 24
 Maysoon al-Eryani, Yemeni poet and translator
 Jeremain Lens, Dutch footballer
 Elena Satine, Georgian-American film actress and singer
 November 26 – Kat DeLuna, American singer
 November 28 – Karen Gillan, Scottish actress

December 

 December 1 – Sarah Snook, Australian actress
 December 2 – Isaac Promise, Nigerian footballer (d. 2019)
 December 3
 Michael Angarano, American actor
 Alicia Sacramone, American gymnast

 December 9 
 Hikaru Nakamura, Japanese born-American chess grandmaster
 Keri-anne Payne, South African born-British swimmer
 December 10 – Gonzalo Higuaín, Argentine footballer
 December 12 – Lao Lishi, Chinese diver
 December 14 – Ana Polvorosa, Spanish actress 
 December 15 – Mikey Garcia, American boxer
 December 18
 Miki Ando, Japanese figure skater
 Ayaka, Japanese singer
 Deiveson Figueiredo, Brazilian martial mixed artist
 Yuki Furukawa, Japanese actor
 Piotr Nowakowski, Polish volleyball player
 December 19
 Shuko Aoyama, Japanese tennis player
 Karim Benzema, French footballer
 Ronan Farrow, American activist
 December 20 – Emmanuel Ekpo, Nigerian footballer
 December 22 – Eder, Portuguese footballer 
 December 23 – Taťána Kuchařová, Czech dancer, model and beauty queen
 December 25 – LJ Reyes, Filipino actress
 December 26 – Mikhail Kukushkin, Russian born-Kazakh tennis player
 December 27 – Lily Cole, British model
 December 28 – Thomas Dekker, American actor, musician, singer, director and producer
 December 29 – Iain De Caestecker, Scottish actor
 December 30 – Jeanette Ottesen, Dutch swimmer
 December 31
 Seydou Doumbia, Ivorian football player
 Émilie Le Pennec, French gymnast
 Maiara & Maraisa, Brazilian Sertanejo music duo

Deaths

January 

 January 2 – Jean de Gribaldy, French road cyclist and directeur sportif (b. 1922)
 January 5 – Herman Smith-Johannsen, Norwegian supercentenarian (b. 1875)
 January 9 – Arthur Lake, American actor (b. 1905)
 January 10
 Håkan Malmrot, Swedish Olympic swimmer (b. 1900)
 Marion Hutton, American singer and actress (b. 1919)
 January 14 – Douglas Sirk, German-born film director (b. 1897)
 January 15 – Ray Bolger, American actor, singer, and dancer (b. 1904)
 January 22 – R. Budd Dwyer, American politician (b. 1939)
 January 25 – Asim Ferhatović, Yugoslav footballer (b. 1933)
 January 27 – Norman McLaren, Canadian animator and director (b. 1914)
 January 28 – Galo Plaza, Ecuadorian statesman, 29th President of Ecuador (b. 1906)
 January 31 – Yves Allégret, French film director (b. 1905)

February 

 February 1
 Gustav Knuth, German film actor (b. 1901)
 Alessandro Blasetti, Italian film director and screenwriter (b. 1900)
 February 2 
 Alistair MacLean, British novelist (b. 1922)
 Carlos José Castilho, Brazilian football goalkeeper (b. 1927)
 February 3 – Nobuhito, Prince Takamatsu, younger brother of Japanese Emperor Hirohito (b. 1905)
 February 4 – Liberace, American pianist, singer and actor (b. 1919)
 February 5 – Otto Wöhler, German general, serving during World War I and World War II (b. 1894)
 February 7 – Claudio Villa, Italian singer (b. 1926)
 February 10 – Robert O'Brien, American racing driver (b. 1908)
 February 11 – Mark Ashton, Irish gay rights activist (b. 1960)
 February 12
 Dennis Poore, British entrepreneur, financier and sometime racing driver (b. 1916)
 Raymond Vouel, Luxembourg politician (b. 1923)
 February 14 – Dmitry Kabalevsky, Russian composer (b. 1904)
 February 22 – Andy Warhol, American artist, director, writer (b. 1928)
 February 23
 Esmond Knight, English actor (b. 1906)
 José Afonso, Portuguese singer-songwriter, teacher and activist (b. 1929)
 February 25
 James Coco, American actor (b. 1930)
 Elisabeth Coit, American architect (b. 1897)
 February 27
 Joan Greenwood, English actress (b. 1921)
 Franciszek Blachnicki, Polish priest (b. 1921)

March 

 March 1 – Freddie Green, American swing jazz guitarist (b. 1911)
 March 2 – Randolph Scott, American actor (b. 1898)
 March 3 – Danny Kaye, American singer, actor, and comedian (b. 1911)
 March 7 – Waldo Salt, American screenwriter (b. 1914)
 March 11 – Joe Gladwin, English actor (b. 1906)
 March 12 - Woody Hayes, American college football coach, coached for Ohio State University
 March 15 – W. Sterling Cole, American politician, first Director General of the International Atomic Energy Agency (b. 1904)
 March 19 – Louis de Broglie, French physicist, Nobel Prize laureate (b. 1892)
 March 21
 Robert Preston, American actor (b. 1918)
 Dean Paul Martin, American pop singer and film and television actor (b. 1951)
 March 26
 Georg Muche, German painter, printmaker, architect, author, and teacher (b. 1895)
 Eugen Jochum, German conductor (b. 1902)
 March 27 – Stane Kavčič, 6th Prime Minister of Slovenia (b. 1919)
 March 28
 Maria von Trapp, Austrian singer (b. 1905)
 Patrick Troughton, English actor (b. 1920)
 Alphonse Alley, Beninese military officer, former Head of State of Dahomey (b. 1930)

April 

 April 1 – Henri Cochet, French tennis champion (b. 1901)
 April 2
 Wang Renmei, Chinese actress and singer (b. 1914)
 Buddy Rich, American jazz drummer (b. 1917)
 April 4 – C. L. Moore, American writer (b. 1911)
 April 5 – Leabua Jonathan, 2nd Prime Minister of Lesotho (b. 1914)
 April 11
 Erskine Caldwell, American writer (b. 1903)
 Kent Taylor, American actor (b. 1907)
 Primo Levi, Italian chemist and writer (b. 1919)
 April 12 – Mike Von Erich, American professional wrestler (b. 1964)
 April 15 – Masatoshi Nakayama, Japanese karate master (b. 1913)
 April 17
 Carlton Barrett, Jamaican reggae drummer (b. 1950)
 Cornelius Van Til, Dutch Christian philosopher, reformed theologian, and presuppositional apologist (b. 1895)
 Dick Shawn, American actor (b. 1923)
 April 19
 Milt Kahl, Animator for the Disney Studio (b. 1909)
 Antony Tudor, English dancer and choreographer (b. 1908)
 Maxwell D. Taylor, American general and diplomat (b. 1901)

May 

 May 2 - Karl Davis, African-American fashion designer (b. 1962)
 May 3 – Dalida, French rock musician (b. 1933)
 May 4
 Paul Butterfield, American musician (b. 1942)
 Cathryn Damon, American actress (b. 1930)
 May 6 – William J. Casey, American Central Intelligence Agency director (b. 1913)
 May 7 – Colin Blakely, Northern Irish actor (b. 1930)
 May 8
 Sir James Plimsoll, Australian public servant (b. 1917)
 Carl Tchilinghiryan, German businessman (b. 1910)
 May 9 – Thodoros Kefalopoulos, Greek actor (b. 1894)
 May 13
 Ismael Rivera, Puerto Rican composer and salsa singer (b. 1931)
 Signe Amundsen, Norwegian operatic soprano (b. 1899)
 May 14 – Rita Hayworth, American actress and dancer (b. 1918)
 May 17 – Gunnar Myrdal, Swedish economist, Nobel Prize laureate (b. 1898)
 May 19 – James Tiptree, Jr., American author (b. 1915)
 May 21 – Alejandro Rey, Argentine actor (b. 1930)
 May 24 – Hermione Gingold, English actress (b. 1897)
 May 27
 Colin McCahon, New Zealand artist (b. 1919)
 John Howard Northrop, American biochemist (b. 1891)
 May 29
 Charan Singh, 5th Prime Minister of India (b. 1902)
 Jozef Langenus, Belgian middle-distance runner (b. 1898)
 May 31 – John Abraham, Indian film director (b. 1937)

June 

 June 1
 Errol Barrow, Caribbean statesman, 1st Prime Minister of Barbados (b. 1920)
 Rashid Karami, Lebanese statesman, 21st Prime Minister of Lebanon (b. 1921)
 Domenico Piemontesi, Italian road bicycle racer (b. 1903)
 June 2 – Andrés Segovia, Spanish guitarist (b. 1893)
 June 3 – Will Sampson, American actor (b. 1933)
 June 6 – Richard Münch, German actor (b. 1916)
 June 9 
 Madge Kennedy, American actress (b. 1891)
 Raya Dunayevskaya, Russian-born philosopher, founder of Marxist humanism in the United States (b. 1910)
 June 10 – Elizabeth Hartman, American actress (b. 1943)
 June 13
 Vera Caspary, American screenwriter, novelist, playwright (b. 1899)
 Geraldine Page, American actress (b. 1924)
 June 20 – Salim Ali, Indian ornithologist and naturalist (b. 1896)
 June 22 – Fred Astaire, American actor, singer, and dancer (b. 1899)
 June 24 – Jackie Gleason, American actor and comedian (b. 1916)
 June 26
 Arthur F. Burns, American economist (b. 1904)
 Henk Badings, Dutch composer (b. 1907)
 June 30 – Federico Mompou, Spanish composer and pianist (b. 1893)

July 

 July 2 – Michael Bennett, American theater director and choreographer (b. 1943)
 July 3 – Viola Dana, American actress (b. 1897)
 July 4 – Abdul Halim, Indonesian politician, 4th Prime Minister of Indonesia (b. 1911)
 July 8 – Gerardo Diego, Spanish poet (b. 1896)
 July 10 – John Hammond, American record producer (b. 1910)
 July 11 – Tom Waddell, American sportsman and competitor (b. 1937)
 July 17
 Kristjan Palusalu, Estonian wrestler (b. 1908)
 Yujiro Ishihara, Japanese actor (b. 1934)
 July 20 – Richard Egan, American actor (b. 1921)
 July 28 - James Burnham, American philosopher and political theorist (b. 1905)

August 

 August 1 – Pola Negri, Polish born actress (b. 1897)
 August 2 – Abu Sayeed Chowdhury, 2nd President of Bangladesh (b. 1921)
 August 5 – Anatoli Papanov, Soviet and Russian stage, film and voice actor (b. 1922)
 August 6
 Léon Noël, French diplomat, politician and historian (b. 1888)
 Ira C. Eaker, World War II United States Army Air Forces general (b. 1896)
 August 7
 Camille Chamoun, 7th President of Lebanon (b. 1900)
 Nobusuke Kishi, Japanese politician, 37th Prime Minister of Japan (b. 1896)
 August 10 – Georgios Athanasiadis-Novas, Prime Minister of Greece (b. 1893)
 August 16 – Andrei Mironov, Soviet and Russian theatre and film actor (b. 1941)
 August 17
 Rudolf Hess, German Nazi official (b. 1894)
 Clarence Brown, American film director (b. 1890)
 Carlos Drummond de Andrade, Brazilian poet (b. 1902)
 August 23 – Didier Pironi, French racing driver (b. 1952)
 August 24 – Bayard Rustin, American civil rights activist (b. 1912)
 August 26 – Georg Wittig, German chemist, Nobel Prize laureate (b. 1897)
 August 28 – John Huston, American film director, screenwriter, and actor (b. 1906)
 August 29 – Lee Marvin, American actor (b. 1924)

September 

 September 1 – Gerhard Fieseler, German World War I flying ace, aerobatics champion, and aircraft designer and manufacturer (b. 1896)
 September 2 – Alfredo Oscar Saint Jean, President of Argentina (1982) (b. 1926)
 September 3 – Morton Feldman, American composer (b. 1926)
 September 4 – Richard Marquand, Welsh film director (b. 1937)
 September 9
 Bill Fraser, Scottish actor (b. 1908)
 Gerrit Jan Heijn, Dutch businessman (b. 1931)
 September 11
 Peter Tosh, Jamaican singer and musician (b. 1944)
 Lorne Greene, Canadian actor, radio personality and singer (b. 1915)
 September 12
 John Qualen, Canadian-American actor (b. 1899)
 J. Lawton Collins, American general (b. 1896)
 September 13 – Mervyn LeRoy, American film producer and director (b. 1900)
 September 17 – Vladimir Basov, Soviet actor, film director and screenwriter (b. 1923)
 September 18 – Américo Tomás, 13th President of Portugal (b. 1894)
 September 19 – Einar Gerhardsen, former Prime Minister of Norway (b. 1897)
 September 21 – Jaco Pastorius, American jazz bassist (b. 1951)
 September 22
 Hákun Djurhuus, 4th Prime Minister of the Faroe Islands (b. 1908)
 Dan Rowan, American comedian (b. 1922)
 Hédi Váradi, Hungarian actress (b. 1929)
 September 23
 Bob Fosse, American theater choreographer and director (b. 1927)
 Erland Van Lidth De Jeude, Dutch-born wrestler, opera singer and actor (b. 1953)
 September 25
 Mary Astor, American actress (b. 1906)
 Emlyn Williams, Welsh writer, dramatist and actor (b. 1905)
 September 29 – Henry Ford II, president of Ford Motor Company (b. 1917)
 September 30 – Alfred Bester, American author (b. 1913)

October 

 October 2
 Madeleine Carroll, English actress (b. 1906)
 Sir Peter Medawar, Brazilian-born British scientist, recipient of the Nobel Prize in Physiology or Medicine (b. 1915)
 October 3
 Jean Anouilh, French dramatist (b. 1910)
 Catherine Bramwell-Booth, English Salvation Army officer (b. 1883)
 Hans Gál, composer, teacher and author (b. 1890)
 October 8
 Spencer Gordon Bennet, American film producer (b. 1893)
 Konstantinos Tsatsos, President of Greece (b. 1899)
 October 9 – William P. Murphy, American physician, recipient of the Nobel Prize in Physiology or Medicine (b. 1892)
 October 11 – Jaime Pardo Leal, Colombian lawyer, union leader, and politician (b. 1941)
 October 12
 Alf Landon, American politician (b. 1887)
 Fahri Korutürk, Turkish diplomat, 6th President of Turkey (b. 1903)
 October 13
 Walter Houser Brattain, American physicist, Nobel Prize laureate (b. 1902)
 Kishore Kumar, Indian actor and playback singer (b. 1929)
 October 15 – Thomas Sankara, Burkinabe politician, 5th Prime Minister of Burkina Faso and 2nd President of Burkina Faso (b. 1949)
 October 19
 Jacqueline du Pré, British cellist (b. 1945)
 Hermann Lang, German race car driver (b. 1909)
 October 20 – Andrey Kolmogorov, Russian mathematician (b. 1903)
 October 22 – Lino Ventura, Italian actor (b. 1919)
 October 27 – Vijay Merchant, Indian cricketer (b. 1911)
 October 28 – André Masson, French artist (b. 1896)
 October 29 – Woody Herman, American jazz musician (b. 1913)
 October 30 – Joseph Campbell, American mythologist, author (b. 1904)

November 

 November 1 – René Lévesque, Canadian politician, 23rd Premier of Quebec (b. 1922)
 November 5 – Georges Franju, French filmmaker (b. 1912)
 November 6
 Zohar Argov, Israeli singer (b. 1955)
 Jean Rivier, French composer of classical music (b. 1896)
 November 7 – Arne Borg, Swedish Olympic swimmer (b. 1901)
 November 10 – Seyni Kountché, Nigerien military officer and statesman, 2nd President of Niger (b. 1931)
 November 12 – Cornelis Vreeswijk, Dutch-born Swedish singer-songwriter, poet and actor (b. 1937)
 November 18 – Jacques Anquetil, French road racing cyclist (b. 1934)
 November 23 – Antonio Sastre, Argentine footballer (b. 1911)
 November 26 – Duncan Sandys, British politician (b. 1908)

December 

 December 1 – James Baldwin, African-American novelist, essayist, playwright and poet (b. 1924) 
 December 2
 Juan Alberto Melgar Castro, Honduran military officer (b. 1930)
 Donn F. Eisele, American astronaut (b. 1930)
 Luis Federico Leloir, French-born chemist, Nobel Prize laureate (b. 1906)
 Yakov Borisovich Zel'dovich, Russian physicist (b. 1914)
 December 4 – Rouben Mamoulian, Armenian-American film director (b. 1897)
 December 8
 Marcos Calderón, Peruvian football coach (b. 1928)
 José González Ganoza, Peruvian footballer (b. 1954)
 December 10 – Jascha Heifetz, Lithuanian-born violinist (b. 1901)
 December 17 – Bernardus Johannes Alfrink, Dutch cardinal (b. 1900)
 December 21 – Ralph Nelson, American film and television director, producer, writer, and actor (b. 1916)
 December 22 – Alice Terry, American actress (b. 1899)
December 23 - Nikki Sixx, American bassist, died for two minutes, fortunately he's still alive (b. 1958)
 December 24
 Joop den Uyl, Dutch politician and journalist, Prime Minister of the Netherlands (1973–1977) (b. 1919)
 M. G. Ramachandran, Indian actor and Chief Minister of the Tamil Nadu (1977–1987) (b. 1917)
 December 27 – Priscilla Dean, American actress (b. 1896)

Nobel Prizes 

 Physics – J. Georg Bednorz, Karl Alexander Müller
 Chemistry – Donald J. Cram, Jean-Marie Lehn, Charles J. Pedersen
 Medicine – Susumu Tonegawa
 Literature – Joseph Brodsky
 Peace – Óscar Arias Sánchez
 Bank of Sweden Prize in Economic Sciences in Memory of Alfred Nobel – Robert Solow

References